Fredericka Foster (born 1944) is an American artist and water activist known for oil painting and photography.

Early life and education
Foster, a graduate of the University of Washington, was also a student and taught at the Factory of Visual Arts, a professional art school founded in Seattle as an alternative to the traditional university art education.

Career
Foster, a painter and photographer, works primarily with the theme of water to raise awareness and examine its centrality to life; how its movement shapes the world socioeconomically, environmentally and subconsciously. An accomplished colorist using a limited palette and many layers of paint, she works "in the romantic landscape tradition of Dove. Hartley, Burchfield and O’Keeffe" Showing her work since the late 1970s, the AIDS epidemic, healing and dying inspired her paintings and installations in the 1990s. Buddhist practice influences her art. She has engaged in public talks with composer Philip Glass on Buddhist practice and art.

Solo shows include five Water Way shows at the Fischbach Gallery in New York and an exhibition at the Beacon Institute for Rivers and Estuaries. She has been in group shows in the United States and Europe, including The Flag Project for the Rubin Museum of Art opening in New York; the "groundbreaking" The Christa Project: Manifesting Divine Bodies on the feminine divine, and the Value of Sanctuary: Building a House Without Walls, both at the Cathedral of Saint John the Divine; and ecoconsciousness at ecoartspace in New Mexico. Her work is in many private and public collections.

Foster is also known for curating and participating in The Value of Water, at the Cathedral of St. John the Divine in New York City. The largest exhibition to ever appear at the Cathedral, it anchored a year long initiative by the Cathedral on our dependence upon water, and featured over forty artists, including Jenny Holzer, Robert Longo, Mark Rothko, William Kentridge, April Gornik, Kara Walker, Kiki Smith, Pat Steir, Edwina Sandys, Alice Dalton Brown, Teresita Fernandez, Eiko Otake and Bill Viola.

Foster and artist Hilda O’Connell contributed a chapter on 15th century Italian art to Art Beyond Sight's Art Beyond Sight: A Resource Guide to Art, Creativity, and Visual Impairment, an art education book and compact disk designed to give visual experiences to people with impaired sight. A complementary video, Art Beyond Sight: A Demonstration of Practical Techniques, was co-produced with the Museum of Modern Art.

Activism 
Foster often collaborates with artists, scientists and non-profit organizations on water in relation to the environment, pollution and climate change. To educate about the water crisis, she presented her work to two hundred and fifty scientists, did a performance based on the 2017 sewage spill into Puget Sound at the Sage Assembly 2017, Exploring a Catastrophe to Water Through Science and Art; and an exhibition and talk at the Beacon Institute for Rivers and Estuaries. Like a Circle in Water, part of the Elements video series commissioned by the Tricycle Foundation in 2014, was an official selection of the Awareness Festival and Blue Ocean Film Festival. She has been interviewed for her work as a cultural activist and taught on art and activism.

Think About Water highlights the work of an ecological collective of artists who use water as their subject or medium, which Foster created and curates. Members include Basia Irland, Aviva Rahmani, Betsy Damon, Diane Burko, Leila Daw, Stacy Levy, Charlotte Coté, Meridel Rubenstein, Rosalyn Driscoll, Doug Fogelson, Giana Pilar González, Rachel Havrelock, Susan Hoffman Fishman, Fritz Horstman, Sant Khalsa, Ellen Kozak, Stacy Levy, Anna Macleod, Ilana Manolson, Lauren Rosenthal McManus, Randal Nichols, Dixie Peaslee, Jaanika Peerna, Aviva Rahmani, Lisa Reindorf, Naoe Suzuki, Linda Troeller, and Adam Wolpert.

Selected bibliography

Films
 Like a Circle in Water, Part of the Elements series, commissioned by the Tricycle Foundation, directed by Andrew Chan Gladstone; summer, 2014; official selection: The Awareness Film Festival, Los Angeles, California; and the Blue Ocean Film Festival, St. Petersburg, Florida.
 Mary Mary, Foster and Christopher Young, 1999; official selection: Northampton Independent Film Festival, Short Program #4: Surreal Reels and the Seattle Underground Film Festival.  
 The Spiritual Journey:  Interfaith Perspectives, Foster paintings shown throughout, Galen Films/Romano Productions, presented to the Parliament of the World's Religions by the Auburn Theological Seminary and the Temple of Understanding, 2000.

Awards
 1998, The Inn at Phillips Mill award, Phillips Mill Photographic Exhibition; New Hope, Pennsylvania 
 1993, First prize, National Polaroid Transfer Exhibition; Kirkland, Washington 
 1989, Grand prize, Harvest of Arts, Bellevue, Washington; Second prize, Pacific Northwest Arts and Crafts Fair, Bellevue, Washington  
 1981, Second prize, Heart of the City, Seattle, Washington

External links
Fredericka Foster 2013 Golden Hour at Fishbach Gallery
Think About Water, curated site featuring artists who work with water
Institute for Cultural Activism interview, October 20, 2020
Instagram page

References

Environmental artists
20th-century American painters
American women painters
Landscape painters
Landscape photographers
Nature photographers
Environmental photography
20th-century American women photographers
20th-century American photographers
Living people
University of Washington alumni
Artists from New York (state)
Artists from Washington (state)
American contemporary painters
American art curators
American women curators
21st-century American women artists
1944 births
21st-century American painters